Albert Edward Hollingworth (16 August 1910 – 1 October 1968) was an Australian rules footballer for the Port Adelaide Football Club in the 1930s.

Hollingworth was a strong marking, long kicking centre half forward who made his league debut in 1934, and enjoyed a very successful season which earned him the club’s best and fairest award. His inaccurate shooting for goal, however, yielding a tally of 4.7, was a factor in Port Adelaide's grand final loss that year.

Hollingworth won another club best and fairest award in 1936, and, after being moved to full forward following Jack Prideaux’s retirement, he topped the Magpies' goal-kicking list in 1938 with 45 goals and in 1939 with 78. A South Australian interstate representative on half a dozen occasions, including both matches at the 1937 Perth carnival, he played a total of 91 league games including five Grand Finals.

References

Port Adelaide Football Club (SANFL) players
1910 births
1968 deaths
Australian rules footballers from South Australia